Bamroli was a  city and a Municipality  in Surat district in the Indian state of Gujarat.  The town is located 15 km south of Surat near Pandesara. The city comes under Surat Metropolitan Region. The city is one of the eight amalgamated Municipalities in Surat City. Now it is an Accommodates more than 4 lacs or 0.4 million people. The city is cosmopolitan  neighbourhood in Surat. The majority of population are from Bihar, Uttar Pradesh, Odisha, Maharashtra, South India, Rajasthan, etc.

Geography 
The city is located at an average elevation of 14 metres (66 feet).

Demographics
 India census, Bamroli had a population of 1,32,876 . Males constitute 53% of the population and females 47%. Bamroli has an average literacy rate of 74%, higher than the national average of 59.5%: male literacy is 81%, and female literacy is 63%. In Bamroli, 14% of the population is under 6 years of age.

Transport 
By road: Bamroli is 6 km from Udhana and 13 km from Surat.

By air: Nearest airport is Surat which is 14 km from Bamroli.

References

See also 
List of tourist attractions in Surat

Suburban area of Surat
Neighbourhoods in Surat